Marion M. Bass, known as Pinky Bass or Pinky/MM Bass, is an American photographer, known for her work in pinhole photography.

Bass, a resident of Fairhope, Alabama, has exhibited at a number of museums including the Asheville Art Museum, Birmingham Museum of Art, Contemporary Arts Museum Houston, the High Museum of Art in Atlanta, Huntsville Museum of Art in Huntsville, Alabama, the Montgomery Museum of Fine Arts in Montgomery, Alabama, Mobile Museum of Art in Mobile, Alabama, National Museum of Women in the Arts (NMWA) in Washington, D.C., the Philadelphia Museum of Art and the Southeastern Center for Contemporary Art in Winston-Salem, North Carolina among others.

Well known for her work in pinhole photography, Bass has work in the collection of the Polaroid Corporation. Bass has taught numerous workshops in pinhole camera across the United States including EMRYS Foundation, Penland School of Crafts and University of Memphis and Space One Eleven. Known for her portable pop-up pinhole cameras, The first of these cameras was a giant pinhole she made out of a pop-up camper -- "Pinky's Portable Pop-up Pinhole Camera and Darkroom". She made this piece for the "Itinerant Photography Project" in 1989.

In March 1997, Bass was honored by the Georgia Commission on Women for "Georgia Women in the Visual Arts".

Exhibitions

Solo exhibitions
Bass has had over 40 solo exhibitions, many of which traveled.
2006: BodyWorks at the University of Montevallo, Bloch Hall Gallery in Spring 2006.<ref>{{Cite web |url=http://www.montevallo.edu/art/artgallery.shtm |title=Works", University of Montevallo solo exhibition |access-date=2007-02-12 |archive-url=https://web.archive.org/web/20070208143928/http://www.montevallo.edu/art/artgallery.shtm |archive-date=2007-02-08 |url-status=dead }}</ref>
2007: Bass' work was chosen by curator, Jon Coffelt as the inaugural artist for the new book arts program at SPACE Gallery in New York, NY. Bass exhibited her Cuerpos Santos Series. SPACE Gallery, New York, 2007.

Exhibitions with othersFor Donna' Barrister's Gallery curated by Deborah Luster featured works by Pinky Bass, Ruth Marten, Danna Moore, Laura Noland-Harter, Donna Service, Barrister's Gallery, New Orleans.The Lensless View: Contemporary Pinhole Photography curated by Diana H. Bloomfield along with work by Rebecca Sexton Larson, Scott McMahon, Christopher Sims, Sarah Van Keuren and Sam Wang.(Id) An Exhibition of Self Portraiture, 2006, along with Dieter Appelt, Judy Dater, Nate Larson, Robert Mapplethorpe, Arno Rafael Minkkinen, Constance Thalken and Bill Thoma."Voices Rising: Alabama Women at the Millennium by the Alabama State Committee of the National Museum of Women in the Arts (NMWA) at the Montgomery Museum of Fine Arts. This exhibition was made into a video presentation (also called Voices Rising) that ran on Alabama Public Television,On/of Paper curated by Pieter Favier included artists from across the country illustrating the diversity of paper, a medium many art critics may overlook. Each artist featured used paper in some fashion to create their featured art. Bass showed a series of her hand-stitched photography at Space 301 in Mobile, Alabama.Politics, Politics: Nice Artists Explore the Political Landscape curated by Anne Arrasmith and Peter Prinz of Space One Eleven. Included Clayton Colvin, Peggy Dobbins, Randy Gachet, binx Newton, Arthur Price, John Trobaugh, Paul Ware, and Stan Woodard.Anthropology: Revisited, Reinvented, Reinterpreted, 2009, along with the work of Lee Isaacs, Karen Graffeo, Sara Garden Armstrong, Janice Kluge, Joel Seah, The Chadwick's, Mitchell Gaudet, Kahn and Selesnick, Mona Hatoum, Beatrice Coron, Kelly Grider, Laura Gilbert, among others. The exhibition was curated by Jon Coffelt and Maddy Rosenberg for Central Booking in Brooklyn, New York.

Awards

 Artist Residency, Visual Studies Workshop, Rochester, New York 1988
 Interdisciplinary Grant (Regional Artist Project) for "The Itinerant Photographer" 1989
 North Carolina Visual Artistic Fellowship Grant 1993
 North Carolina Visual Arts Project Grant 1992
 Alabama Fellowship Grant, Alabama State Council on the Arts 1991
 Site Sculpture Grant "Big Box Camera", Arts Festival of Atlanta, Georgia 1990
 International Print Exhibition Award, Print Club, Philadelphia, Pennsylvania 1990
 Southern Arts Federation/National Endowment for the Arts Visual Arts Fellowship 1995
 Resen Ceramic Colony Residency (Catalog Photographer), Republic of Macedonia 1997
 Residency, Western Carolina University, Cullowee, North Carolina 2000
 Residency, Oregon College of Art & Craft, Portland, Oregon 2004

Publications with contributions by Bass
 Tangle of Complexes: Photographing in Mexico. Birmingham, Alabama: Space One Eleven, 1996. Includes Pinky/MM Bass; exhibition catalogue; text in English and Spanish; first edition; paperback, 24 pages, 28 cm. The Women in Photography International Archive (now within Beinecke Rare Book and Manuscript Library at Yale University) has a copy (as noted in "Publications centered on single photographers: Books A–C."
 How to make a PinHole Camera on pages 15 and 23 from The Book of Alternative Processes by James Christopher, Delmar Press, Albany, NY, 2001, Dewey, 771. .
 The Polaroid Book. By Barbara Hitchcock, Steve Crist, Taschen, 2005 Hardback. 400 pages. .
 Pinhole Photography: Rediscovering a Historic Technique. E. Renner, 1995, 288pp.
 Sleep: Bedtime Reading. By Roger Gorman and Robert Peacock. Universe Publishing, 1998. 96pp .
 Red Bluff Review. By Sonny Brewer, 1995.

Film
 Coat of Many Colors, directed by Michelle Forman and Carolyn Hales, 2001 documentary for television featured Pinky Bass as herself.
 "Memento Mori: Positive/Negative"'' contains black and white images. Alabama Public Television.
  is a Butoh performance by Pinky Bass filmed by Doug Baulos at Space One Eleven, Birmingham, Alabama on 2-02-07

References

External links
 
 "Coat of Many Colors"
 Alabama Public Television
 University of Montevallo shows an example of her photography with hand-stitching.
 Pinhole Camera Homepage shows an example of Bass pinhole camera work
 The Light Factory shows en example of her hand-stitched sculpture
 Anna Lamar Switzer Center for Visual Arts Pensacola Junior College, "Pinhole Visions" Pensacola, Florida, 2006
 EMRYS Foundation, Greenville, South Carolina lists Bass pinhole workshop
 the Barristers Gallery New Orleans, Louisiana 2005 Group exhibition
 Southeastern Center for Contemporary Art Winston-Salem, North Carolina 2003 Group Exhibition
 Creative Loafing Charlotte, North Carolina 2006
 ''"The Book of Alternative Photographic Processes'", Examples of Bass work on pg. 15
 Georgia Southern University, (George-Anne) Southern Daily critic Vanessa Keber Statesboro, Georgia 1999
 Number: Inc. #37, page 13 lists a Bass lecture at University of Memphis, Memphis, Tennessee

Living people
American photographers
Artists from Alabama
Western Carolina University faculty
People from Fairhope, Alabama
American women photographers
American women academics
21st-century American women